Gemalla is a locality in western New South Wales, Australia. It is located on the Main Western railway line between Tarana and Locksley. A railway station was provided between 1907 and 1974.

References

Localities in New South Wales